The W Line, also called the West Rail Line, is a light rail line in Denver, Lakewood, and Golden, Colorado, United States. The W Line was the first part of FasTracks to break ground, on May 16, 2007. The line, the only line to traverse the West Corridor, opened for service on Friday, April 26, 2013.

History 
The Denver, Lakewood and Golden Railroad started operations in the area in 1893, switching to electric traction by 1909 as the Denver and Intermountain Railroad. The route ran from the downtown Denver interurban loop, along Lakewood Gulch and 13th Avenue, continuing out to Golden. Interurban service continued until 1950, when all Denver area trolley and interurban service ceased.

Plans to resurrect a railway line from Denver to Golden were advanced in the mid-1970s and in the 1980s RTD purchased the right-of-way to an unused rail corridor between the two cities. A study conducted in 1997 stated the need for a rapid transit corridor through the region, and settled on 13th Avenue as the locally preferred alternative. An environmental impact statement was started in 2001 and finished with a record of decision in 2004.  A "rail-pulling" ceremony was held on the 13th Avenue corridor on May 16, 2007, and construction started in earnest in early 2008.

As project costs climbed above the initial estimates, cuts were made, including reducing the line from a double track to a single-track operation from west of the Federal Center Station to the end of the line at the Jefferson County Government Center.

The first full test run of the line happened on January 3, 2013, in anticipation of the official opening, April 26, 2013, eight months ahead of schedule.

Route 
The W Line follows the Central Platte Valley Corridor (CPV) from Union Station, stopping at Pepsi Center/Elitch Gardens, Sports Authority Field at Mile High and a relocated Auraria West Campus station. It then leaves the CPV corridor, traveling under U.S. Route 40/U.S. Route 287, crosses over the UP/BNSF consolidated mainline on a new bridge, travels under Interstate 25, and then over the South Platte River. The corridor then travels west along the Lakewood Gulch until Lamar station, where it begins to follow 13th Avenue until it reaches the Lakewood Industrial Park at Oak station. From there, the line turns south along the Remington spur to reach the Denver Federal Center. From the Federal Center, the line narrows to a single-track line and travels west along U.S. Route 6 to the western terminus at Jefferson County Government Center in Golden. The single-track section limits headways to no better than every 15 minutes over that section of the line.

The W Line is the first light rail route in metro Denver to make extensive use of gated grade crossings within its right-of-way (there were only four such grade crossings on the previously existing network). Some of the route goes through residential areas and concerns about noise led to an innovative solution for the warning system at crossing gates. The warning bells will adjust their volume in response to the ambient noise resulting in 50-70 dB during the evening hours compared to the standard volume of 90-100 dB.

Stations 
Three different fare zones exist along the W Line.

References

External links 

RTD W Line Schedule

 
750 V DC railway electrification
Railway lines opened in 2013